This is a list of MediaTek processors for use in smartphones, tablets, smartwatches, IoT, Smart TVs and smartbooks.

Smartphone processors from ARMv5 to ARMv8 (2003–2019)

ARMv5

ARMv6

ARMv7 
Single core

Dual-core

Quad-core

Hexa-core and octa-core

ARMv8 
Quad-core

Octa-core

Helio Series

Helio X Series (2014–2017)

Helio A Series (2018–2020)

Helio P Series (2015–2020)

Helio G Series (2019–present)

Dimensity Series (2020–present)

Dimensity 700 Series

Dimensity 800 Series

Dimensity 900 Series

Dimensity 1000 Series

Dimensity 6000 Series

Dimensity 7000 Series

Dimensity 8000 Series

Dimensity 9000 Series

Standalone application and tablet processors

Kompanio Series

Digital television SoCs

Pentonic Series

Wearable device SoCs

Internet-of-Things (IoT) SoCs

Wireless connectivity SoC 
MT6630 (2014) is a five-in-one combo wireless SoC integrating dual-band 802.11a/b/g/n/ac, advanced Wi-Fi Direct and Miracast support, Bluetooth 4.1, ANT+, tri-band GPS and FM transceiver. It is intended to be paired with chips like the MT6595 octa-core smartphone processor which features an integrated 4G modem but no built-in Wi-Fi/Bluetooth/GPS/FM functionality. It could also be used in tablets in conjunction with a stand-alone application processor.

See also 

 List of Qualcomm Snapdragon processors
 List of Samsung Exynos processors

References 

ARM-based systems on chips
MediaTek